Johann Heinrich Scheibler (11 November 1777 – 20 January 1837) was a silk manufacturer from Crefeld, Prussia, without a scientific background, who went on to make contributions to the science of acoustics as a self taught musicologist.  He made a "tonometer" from 56 tuning forks as an instrument for accurately measuring pitch by counting beating, described in 1834. "A wooden board...together with a small wooden mallet with which the forks are to be struck, and a good metronome, constitute Scheibler's tuning apparatus."

If the frequency of a tuning fork is known, then a higher fork's frequency may be determined by using a metronome to determine the frequency of the beating: F1+beating=F2. Joseph Sauveur (1653–1716) used this method to determine the relative frequencies of organ pipes and improve the earlier calculations of Marin Mersenne based on Mersenne's laws.

His writings include:
 Der physikalische und musikalische Tonmesser, welcher… [The Physical and Musical Tonometer]; G. D. Bädeker, Essen, 1834.
 Ueber mathematische Stimmung, Temperaturen und Orgelstimmung nach Vibrations-Differenzen oder Stößen [On the mathematics of tuning: temperature and organ-tuning after alterations of vibration], Krefeld, 1837.

See also
Savart wheel
Stuttgart pitch

References

1777 births
1837 deaths
Scientists from North Rhine-Westphalia
German musicologists
People from Krefeld
People from Monschau